Raymond Blemker (August 9, 1937 – February 15, 1994) was an American professional baseball player. The left-handed pitcher appeared in a single Major League game as a member of the Kansas City Athletics during the  season.

Born in Huntingburg, Indiana, Blemker attended Georgia Tech, where he was a two-sport star. He was a second team All-America as a pitcher and first baseman for the "Ramblin' Wreck", as well as a two-time All-Southeastern Conference basketball player.  As of 2013, he ranked #25 in career scoring in Yellow Jackets' history. While at Tech he was a member of Phi Sigma Kappa fraternity.

He signed with the Athletics in 1959 and spent his entire four-season career in the Kansas City organization.

He won a combined 13 games (losing nine) during a 1960 minor league season split between the Double-A and Triple-A levels. In midyear, he was recalled by the Athletics for his lone MLB appearance.  On Sunday, July 3, against the Boston Red Sox at Fenway Park, he came into the game in the seventh inning in relief of Don Larsen with a runner on base and Boston leading 7–2, Blemker allowed the inherited runner to score, then proceeded to allow four additional runs on a grand slam home run by Willie Tasby.  He also pitched the eighth inning and allowed a final tally, as the Red Sox won, 13–2.

In 1 big-league innings pitched, Blemker surrendered five earned runs on three hits, two bases on balls, one hit by pitch and one wild pitch.  He did not record a strikeout.  During his minor league career, he won 28 of 44 decisions (.636).

Blemker died at St. Mary's Medical Center in Evansville, Indiana, on February 15, 1994, at the age of 56.

References

External links

1937 births
1994 deaths
Albuquerque Dukes players
Baseball players from Indiana
Binghamton Triplets players
Dallas Rangers players
Georgia Tech Yellow Jackets baseball players
Georgia Tech Yellow Jackets men's basketball players
Hawaii Islanders players
Kansas City Athletics players
Major League Baseball pitchers
People from Huntingburg, Indiana
Shreveport Sports players
Sioux City Soos players